Tonk may refer to:

Places

India
 Tonk, India, city in Rajasthan
 Tonk (Lok Sabha constituency), 
 Tonk district
 Tonk State, Indian princely state (1806–1949)
 Tonk, Raebareli, a village in Uttar Pradesh, India
 Tonk Khurd, a town in Madhya Pradesh

Pakistan
 Tonk, Pakistan

Other uses
 Tonk (card game), a card game
 Tonk meteorite, a meteorite that landed near Tonk, India
 Tonk, an expression that lacks logical harmony
 Tonk, short for Tonkinese, a breed of cat

See also

 Honky Tonk (disambiguation)
Tonka (disambiguation)
 Tonks, a surname
Tonko